KPCR-LP is an Alternative Rock/Indie Rock formatted broadcast radio station.  The station is licensed to Santa Cruz, California and serving Santa Cruz, Paradise Park, and Pasatiempo in California, including the campus of the University of California at Santa Cruz.  KPCR-LP is owned and operated by Central Coast Media Education Foundation.

References

External links
 Pirate Cat Radio 101.9 Online
 

2015 establishments in California
Alternative rock radio stations in the United States
Radio stations established in 2015
PCR-LP